Superfeedr is a feed API built on WebSub, which is sometimes referred to as PuSH. It transforms a variety of feeds into standardized RSS, Atom, or JSON format and distributes (or "pushes") them via WebSub or XMPP. Feeds allow publishers to send notifications to subscribers when content is updated.

History
Superfeedr was launched by in 2009 by parent company Notifixious. While Notifixious' website went offline sometime between September 23, 2009 January 5, 2010, Superfeedr has remained online and available.

While the website of Notifixious, the parent company of Superfeedr, is no longer available Superfeedr continues to refer to it in the terms of service for the site.

Superfeedr was bought by Medium in 2016.

Technology
PuSH is a protocol that relies on webhooks to push feed updates in real-time from publishers to subscribers in a decentralized manner. PuSH builds on existing protocols, ensuring that polling infrastructures currently in use are not changed or broken on implementation, and that polling is still available as a back-up. Superfeedr acts as a “default” hub: a hub which works for any RSS or Atom feed, whether their publisher supports the protocol or not.

Superfeedr also built a feed graph to identify updates in related feeds to avoid polling feeds too aggressively.

Features
Publishers are web applications that host their WebSub hub with Superfeedr, while subscribers are applications that consume the feed API to aggregate feeds from across the web. Trackers, a new type of user, was added to Superfeedr in April 2015. Trackers are applications that subscribe to search queries. Complex queries can be tracked by including or excluding search terms, exact or inexact match queries, and by using language filters. The tracking feature (a prospective search engine) is scaled to parse millions of feeds and their metadata to add extra filtering options.

Funding 
In late 2009, Mark Cuban and Betaworks invested in Superfeedr during a round of seed funding.

References

Aggregation websites
Application programming interfaces
RSS